The B&O Railroad Museum is a museum and historic railway station exhibiting historic railroad equipment in Baltimore, Maryland. The Baltimore and Ohio Railroad (B&O) company originally opened the museum on July 4, 1953, with the name of the Baltimore & Ohio Transportation Museum. It has been called one of the most significant collections of railroad treasures in the world and has the largest collection of 19th-century locomotives in the U.S. The museum is located in the Baltimore and Ohio Railroad's old Mount Clare Station and adjacent roundhouse, and retains 40 acres of the B&O's sprawling Mount Clare Shops site, which is where, in 1829, the B&O began America's first railroad and is the oldest railroad manufacturing complex in the United States.

Mount Clare is considered to be a birthplace of American railroading, as the site of the first regular railroad passenger service in the U.S., beginning on May 22, 1830.  It was also to this site that the first telegraph message, "What hath God wrought?" was sent on May 24, 1844, from Washington, D.C., using Samuel Morse's electric telegraph.

The museum houses collections of 19th- and 20th-century artifacts related to America's railroads. The collection includes 250 pieces of railroad rolling stock, 15,000  artifacts,  of archival material, four significant 19th-century buildings, including the historic roundhouse, and a mile of track, considered the most historic mile of railroad track in the United States. Train rides are offered on the mile of track on Wednesday through Sunday from April through December and on weekends in January. In 2002, the museum had 160,000 visitors annually.

The museum also features an outdoor G-scale layout, two indoor HO scale model, and a wooden model train for children to climb on. From Thanksgiving through the New Year, local model railroad groups set up large layouts on the roundhouse floor and in select locations on the grounds of the museum. A museum store offers toys, books, DVDs, and other railroad-related items.

The museum and station were designated as a U.S. National Historic Landmark in 1961. In 2008, the museum won three awards in Nickelodeon's Parents' Picks Awards in the categories of Best Museum for Little Kids, Best Indoor Playspace for Little Kids, and Best Indoor Playspace for Big Kids. Television and film actor Michael Gross is the museum's "celebrity spokesman".

The museum definitively documented 24 Freedom Seekers that used the B&O Railroad on their journeys on the Underground Railroad - 8 of which traveled through the museum's historic site of Mount Clare. In 2021, the museum's Mt Clare Station building was designated as a National Park Service Underground Railroad Network to Freedom site.

The museum also hosts an annual Day out with Thomas event every year, complete with the train's excursion including a non-powered Thomas the Tank Engine replica.

History
The adjacent roundhouse designed by Ephraim Francis Baldwin was built in 1884 to service the B&O's passenger cars.

For much of its history, the B&O had been collecting locomotives and other artifacts from its history for public relations purposes.  This collection was stored in various places until the railroad decided to centralize it in a permanent home.  The car shop of the Mt. Clare Shops was chosen, and the new museum opened on July 4, 1953.

The museum ended up outliving its parent B&O Railroad, and was kept intact by both the Chessie System and CSX Corporation.  In 1990, CSX deeded the property and collection to the newly formed, not-for-profit museum organization governed by an independent board of directors and provided it with a $5 million endowment.  In 1999, the museum became affiliated with the Smithsonian Institution.

In the early morning of February 17, 2003, heavy snow from the Presidents' Day Storm collapsed half of the roof of the museum's roundhouse.  Although the structure's central support columns remained standing, the supporting iron struts and ties of the destroyed roofing sections failed under the snow load. The museum suffered heavy damage not only to the roundhouse itself but also to the collection within the roundhouse. Some of the items were damaged beyond repair. Reporting on the devastation the following day, The Baltimore Sun said, "...hours after the collapse, columns of mangled steel stuck out from the roundhouse ... Locomotives and passenger cars in the museum's collection, some dating from the 1830s, could be seen covered with snow and debris." The roundhouse, with a newly repaired roof, reopened to the public on November 13, 2004, and the damaged locomotives and cars were surrounded by a plexiglass barrier. As of September 2015, all damaged exhibits have been restored to their original appearance.

After the roof collapse, subsequent fundraising and restoration allowed the museum to upgrade many of its facilities. In 2005 the museum opened a new service facility west of the roundhouse for restoration of historical equipment and maintenance of active equipment.

Collection 
The B&O Railroad Museum possesses the oldest and most comprehensive American railroad collections in the world. Dating from the beginning of American railroading, the collection contains locomotives and rolling stock, historic buildings, railroading artifacts, and an extensive archives and research library that document the impact of American railroading and the Baltimore & Ohio Railroad on American economics, culture, and history.

The collection is being made available through an online searchable database.

Notable rolling stock

The museum's rolling stock collection include both originals and replicas, some of which were built by the B&O for its centennial "Fair of the Iron Horse" in 1927. Collection highlights include:

Baltimore and Ohio 4-4-0 #25 William Mason built in 1856, used in The Great Locomotive Chase, and later in Wild Wild West. Operated until October 2014, retired from service due to thin crown sheet.
Baltimore & Ohio 0-4-0 "Tom Thumb" 1927 replica. Had been refurbished by the Strasburg Rail Road and restored to operating condition for 2004 "Fair of the Iron Horse." Only operated a handful of times, at most, after refurbishment. On display in the roundhouse, in non-operational condition. In need of Federally mandated boiler inspection to operate again. Last operated circa Christmas 2013. 
Baltimore & Ohio 0-4-0 #8 "John Hancock" built in 1836.
Baltimore & Ohio 4-2-0 #13 "Lafayette" 1927 replica. In the past, it was occasionally fired up and operated by the museum for demonstration purposes, currently on display in the roundhouse, in non-operational condition. In need of federally mandated boiler inspection to operate again. Last operated circa October 2015
Cumberland Valley 2-2-2T #13 "Pioneer"  built in 1851. On loan.
Baltimore & Ohio 4-6-0 #305: (Built in 1869 at Mt. Clare, Mother Hubbard design based on Ross Winans' design. Previously #217.)
Baltimore & Ohio 4-6-0 #147 "Thatcher Perkins" built in 1863.
Baltimore & Ohio 0-8-0 #57 "Memnon" built in 1848.
Baltimore and Ohio 2-8-0 #545 A.J. Cromwell built in 1888.
Baltimore and Ohio 2-6-0 #600 "J. C. Davis" built at Mt. Clare in 1875, which won first prize at the 1876 Centennial Exposition.
St. Elizabeth's Hospital 0-4-0T #4: one of the last Porter steam locomotives built, built in 1950 for use at St. Elizabeth's Hospital in Washington DC. Later ran at Ft. Eustis then in storage at Cass Scenic Railroad. Arrived at B&O Museum in 1980s. Restored to operating condition in 2002 and re-restored in 2005 after suffering damage in a roof collapse. Out of Service for a 1,472-day inspection, last operated circa Fall 2015. Coal burner.
Clinchfield Railroad 4-6-0 #1 built in 1882. The engine was used for excursions from 1968 until 1979.

Baltimore and Ohio 0-4-0 "Grasshopper", built in 1832 by Phineas Davis and Israel Gartner, one of the oldest surviving American locomotives
Baltimore and Ohio 4-6-2 #5300 "President Washington" built in 1927.
Baltimore and Ohio 2-8-2 #4500, USRA Light Mikado and the world's first USRA locomotive, built in 1918.
Chesapeake and Ohio 4-6-0 #377 built in 1902.
Chesapeake and Ohio 4-6-4 #490: The last surviving C&O "Streamlined" Hudson built in 1946.
Chesapeake and Ohio 2-8-4 #2705 built in 1943.
Chesapeake and Ohio 2-6-6-6 #1604: One of two surviving "Allegheny"-class locomotives built in 1941.
American Freedom Train 4-8-4 #1 (Reading #2101) built in 1945. One of three steam engines used on American Freedom Train of 1975–1976. Used on Chessie System Steam Specials in 1977–1978.
Greenbrier, Cheat and Elk River Shay #1 built in 1905.
Central Railroad of New Jersey 4-4-2 #592 built in 1901, one of five surviving Camelback type locomotives.
Potomac Electric Company (PEPCO) Fireless 0-4-0 #43
Pere Marquette SW1 #11 built in 1942. Operational.
Central Railroad of New Jersey #1000: first commercially successful diesel built in 1925.
Baltimore & Ohio EA #51: first streamlined diesel built in 1937. Recently completed cosmetic restoration.
Baltimore & Ohio RDC #1961 built in 1956. Operational.
Western Maryland BL2 #81 built in 1948 and Slug #138T built in 1941.
Baltimore & Ohio GP30 #6944 built in 1962. Operational.
Baltimore & Ohio GP40 #3684 built in 1966.
Baltimore & Ohio GP9 #6607. built in 1956. Operational.
Western Maryland RS3 #195 built in 1953
Baltimore & Annapolis 70 tonner #50 built in 1950
Baltimore & Ohio (Octoraro) S1 #3
Canton Railroad Baldwin VO-1000 #32 built in 1944
Baltimore & Ohio GP7 #6405 built in 1953. Operational.
Chessie System GP38 #3802 built in 1967. Chosen by Trains Magazine as "All American Diesel". Operational.
Baltimore & Ohio #10 (electric)
Pennsylvania Railroad #4876: GG1 electric, not currently on display in the museum itself. This locomotive crashed into Washington D.C.'s Union Station in 1953 in the 1953 Federal Express train wreck.
MARC F7A APCU #7100: built in 1951, rebuilt in 1981. Used as a cab car and for supplying HEP.
Maryland and Pennsylvania Railroad ("Ma & Pa") inspection car and Railway post office car
Forty and Eights "Merci" boxcar. One of 49 French boxcars gifted to the US in 1949.
B&O Royal Blue Line 1890s-era coach
Chessie System GP15T 1507. Built in 1982 and was just recently acquired. To be restored.

Exhibitions
The B&O Railroad Museum has over nine public acres of historic buildings and grounds with exhibitions and collection items on display. Some highlighted exhibitions include:

 The Roundhouse: The First Century of Railroading
 The First American Locomotives: The Fair of the Iron Horse
 Civil War: The War Came by Train
 North Car Shop: 20th Century American Railroading
 Bank of America Model Train Gallery
 Smithsonian Model Train Collection
 Dining on the B&O: The China Collection
 Cool Runnings on the Railroad: The American Refrigeration Car
 About Time: The Standardization of Time

See also

List of heritage railroads in the United States
List of National Historic Landmarks in Maryland
List of railway roundhouses
National Register of Historic Places listings in South and Southeast Baltimore
National Park Service's Network to Freedom listing

References

External links

B&O Railroad Museum: Ellicott City Station
Baltimore, Maryland, a National Park Service Discover Our Shared Heritage Travel Itinerary
, including photo in 1992, at Maryland Historical Trust

Baltimore & Ohio Railroad Museum at Octrianguy.com
B&O Railroad Museum on Google Street View

1830 establishments in Maryland
Historic American Buildings Survey in Baltimore
Historic American Engineering Record in Baltimore
Museums in Baltimore
National Historic Landmarks in Maryland
National Register of Historic Places in Howard County, Maryland
Pigtown, Baltimore
Railroad museums in Maryland
Railroad roundhouses in Maryland
Railroad-related National Historic Landmarks
Railway stations in the United States opened in 1830
Railway stations on the National Register of Historic Places in Maryland
Smithsonian Institution affiliates
Former Baltimore and Ohio Railroad stations
Transportation in Baltimore
Railway roundhouses on the National Register of Historic Places
Railway buildings and structures on the National Register of Historic Places in Maryland
Industrial buildings and structures on the National Register of Historic Places in Maryland
Heritage railroads in Maryland
Former railway stations in Maryland
Baltimore City Landmarks